Texas's 37th congressional district of the United States House of Representatives was created as a result of the 2020 census. It consists of a portion of Travis County, including much of Austin, and extends into southern Williamson County. It is represented by Lloyd Doggett. The district is contained predominantly in Travis County with a small portion of Williamson County, and consists of the majority of the city of Austin as well as small areas of its suburbs.

From 1903 to 2005, the Austin area had been covered solely by Texas's 10th congressional district, which initially covered all of Travis County and areas from surrounding counties, but which steadily shrank over time as Austin grew more populated. From 2005, the Austin area was partitioned between several congressional districts, and the 10th's then-incumbent representative, Democrat Lloyd Doggett, was forced to move first to the 25th district from 2005–13 and then to the 35th district from 2013–23, both of which contained both a portion of Austin and an extensive area outside of it.

After eighteen years of there being no Austin-centered district, the 37th district was created as of 2023, centered on the Austin area as the pre-2005 10th district had been.

List of members representing the district

Election results

2022

See also

Texas's congressional districts
List of United States congressional districts

References

37
Constituencies established in 2023
2023 establishments in Texas